Ryszard Horodecki (born 30 September 1943) is a Polish physicist and a professor of University of Gdańsk. He contributed largely to the field of quantum informatics. In his most widely cited paper, 'Separability of Mixed States: Necessary and Sufficient Conditions' written together with his sons, Michał and Paweł, he proposed the idea currently known as the Peres-Horodecki criterion. With over 12,000 citations, he is considered to be one of the leading Polish physicists .

Career
He graduated from Department of Electronics, University of Gdańsk. Horodecki received his Ph.D. from Gdańsk University of Technology in 1976. Twenty-one years later, in 1997 he obtained his habilitation from Nicolaus Copernicus University in Toruń. His contribution to the quantum informatics were acknowledged in 2008, when he received the Prize of the Foundation for Polish Science in the field of mathematics and physics. In 2010 he became a member of Polish Academy of Sciences, whereas in 2011 received prestigious ERC Advanced Grant.

Beyond scientific work, Horodecki publishes also poems in several Polish newspapers, particularly in Tygodnik Powszechny.

Personal life

Horodecki's sons, Michał, Paweł, and Karol are also physicists working in Gdańsk with all of whom he jointly published the review article "Quantum entanglement".

Honours and awards

 Prize of the Foundation for Polish Science (2008)
 European Research Council Advanced Grant (2011)

Most influential publications

 Horodecki M., Horodecki P., Horodecki R., (1996) Separability of Mixed States: Necessary and Sufficient Conditions, Physics Letters A

References

External links
 Some information about Horodecki - Foundation for Polish Science webpage
 National Quantum Information Centre in Gdansk - Scientific Council
 Interview with Horodecki (in Polish)
 Horodecki in the database of Polish scientists (in Polish)
 Short clip about Horodecki made by Foundation for Polish Science
 Horodecki awarded a Two Million Euro ERC grant - news report
  Corresponding Members of the Polish Academy of Sciences

1943 births
Living people
20th-century Polish physicists
People from Kovel
University of Gdańsk alumni
Gdańsk University of Technology alumni
Nicolaus Copernicus University in Toruń alumni
Academic staff of the University of Gdańsk
Members of the Polish Academy of Sciences
European Research Council grantees